Anne Conway (also known as Viscountess Conway; née Finch; 14 December 1631 – 23 February 1679) was an English philosopher whose work, in the tradition of the Cambridge Platonists, was an influence on Gottfried Leibniz. Conway's thought is a deeply original form of rationalist philosophy, with hallmarks of gynocentric concerns and patterns that lead some to think of it as unique among seventeenth-century systems.

Biography
Anne Finch was born to Sir Heneage Finch (who had held the posts of the Recorder of London and Speaker of the House of Commons under Charles I) and his second wife, Elizabeth (daughter of William Cradock of Staffordshire).  Her father died the week before her birth. She was the youngest child. Her early education was by tutors and included Latin, to which she later added Greek and Hebrew. Her half-brother, John Finch, who encouraged her interests in philosophy and theology, introduced Anne to the Cambridge Platonist Henry More, who was one of John's tutors at Christ's College, Cambridge. This led to a lifelong correspondence and close friendship between them on the subject of René Descartes' philosophy, over the course of which Anne grew from More's informal pupil to his intellectual equal. More said of her that he had "scarce ever met with any Person, Man or Woman, of better Natural parts than Lady Conway" (quoted in Richard Ward's The Life of Henry More (1710) p. 193), and that "in the knowledge of things as well Natural and Divine, you have not onely out-gone all of your own Sex, but even of that other also." Conway grew up in the house now known as Kensington Palace, which her family owned at the time.

In 1651, she married Edward Conway, later 1st Earl of Conway, and in the following year More dedicated his book Antidote against Atheism to her. In 1658, Anne gave birth to her only child, Heneage Edward Conway, who died of smallpox just two years later. Her husband was also interested in philosophy and had himself been tutored by More, but she went far beyond him in both the depth of her thought and the variety of her interests.  She became interested in the Lurianic Kabbalah, and then in Quakerism, to which she converted in 1677.  In England at that time the Quakers were generally disliked and feared, and suffered persecution and even imprisonment.  Conway's decision to convert, to make her house a centre for Quaker activity, and to proselytise actively was thus particularly bold and courageous.

Her life from the age of twelve (when she suffered a period of fever) was marked by the recurrence of severe migraines.  These meant that she was often incapacitated by pain, and she spent much time under medical supervision and searching for a cure (at one point even having her jugular veins opened). She had medical advice from Dr. Thomas Willis. Conway was famously treated by many of the great physicians of her time, but none of the treatments had any effect. She died in 1679 at the age of forty-seven.

The Principles of the Most Ancient and Modern Philosophy
The text itself was probably written in 1677 and shows the influence of Franciscus Mercurius van Helmont.
The text was first published in Latin translation by van Helmont in Amsterdam in 1690 as Principia philosophiae antiquissimae et recentissimae. An English retranslation appeared in 1692. The Principles develops Conway's monistic view of the world as created from one substance. Conway is critical of the Cartesian idea that bodies are constituted of dead matter, of Henry More's concept of the soul in his Antidote Against Atheism, and of dualist theories of the relationship between the body and spirit.

Bibliography 
The principles of the most ancient and modern philosophy (London: n. publ., 1692) 168 pp. in 12°. – originally printed in Latin: Principia philosophiae antiquissimae et recentissimae de Deo, Christo & Creatura, Amsterdam: M. Brown 1690.
Letters. The Correspondence of Anne, Viscountess Conway, Henry More and their friends, 1642–1684, ed. M. H. Nicolson (London 1930) 517 pp.
 Collaborations with Franciscus Mercurius van Helmont (1614–1698) 
A Cabbalistical Dialogue (1682) (in Christian Knorr von Rosenroth, Kabbala denudata, 1677–1684)
Two Hundred Quiries moderately propounded concerning the Doctrine of the Revolution of Humane Souls (1684).

References

Further reading
 Broad, Jacqueline. Women Philosophers of the Seventeenth Century. Cambridge Cambridge University Press, 2002.
 Brown, Stuart. "Leibniz and Henry More’s Cabbalistic Circle", in S. Hutton (ed.) Henry More (1614–1687): Tercentenary Studies, Dordrecht: Kluwer Academic Publishers, 1990.(Challenges the view that Conway influenced Leibniz.)
 Duran, Jane. "Anne Viscountess Conway: a Seventeenth-Century Rationalist". Hypatia: a Journal of Feminist Philosophy. 4 (1989): 64–79.
 Frankel, Lois. "Anne Finch, Viscountess Conway,"  Mary Ellen Waithe, ed., A History of Women Philosophers, Vol. 3, Kluwer, 1991, pp. 41–58.
 Gabbey, Alan. "Anne Conway et Henry More: lettres sur Descartes" (Archives de Philosophie 40, pp. 379–404)
 
 Hutton, Sarah. "Conway, Anne (c.1630–79)", 1998, doi:10.4324/9780415249126-DA021-1. Routledge Encyclopedia of Philosophy, Taylor and Francis, .
 Hutton, Sarah, "Lady Anne Conway", The Stanford Encyclopedia of Philosophy (Fall 2008 Edition), Edward N. Zalta (ed.).
 Hutton, Sarah. Anne Conway, a Woman Philosopher. Cambridge, U.K.: Cambridge University Press, 2004.
 
 King, Peter J. One Hundred Philosophers (New York: Barron's, 2004) 
 Lascano, Marcy P. "Anne Conway: Bodies in the Spiritual World"; Philosophy Compass 8.4 (2013):327-336.
 Merchant, Carolyn, "The Vitalism of Anne Conway: its Impact on Leibniz's Concept of the Monad" (Journal of the History of Philosophy 17, 1979, pp. 255–269) (Argues that Conway influenced Leibniz by showing parallels between Leibniz and Conway.)
 Mercer, Christia. "Platonism in Early Modern Natural Philosophy: The Case of Leibniz and Conway", in Neoplatonism and the Philosophy of Nature, James Wilberding and Christoph Horn, ed., Oxford: Oxford University Press, 2012, 103–26.
 
 White,Carol Wayne. The Legacy of Anne Conway (1631–1679): Reverberations from a Mystical Naturalism (State University of New York Press, 2009)

External links
 
 Conway (1631–1679) – Anne Conway, Viscountess Conway and Killultagh encyclopedic article at Project Vox.
 
 
  Contains "The principles of the most ancient and modern philosophy", slightly modified for easier reading
 The principles of the most ancient and modern philosophy by Anne Conway (London: n. publ., 1692) at A Celebration of Women Writers
  Peter King's page
  William Uzgalis' page
 What Kind of Monist is Anne Finch Conway? Jessica Gordon-Roth, Journal of the American Philosophical Association, Volume 4, Issue, Fall 2018, pp. 280–297

Conway, Lady Anne Finch
Conway, Lady Anne Finch
17th-century English philosophers
17th-century English women writers
17th-century non-fiction writers
17th-century English writers
Cambridge Platonists
Converts to Quakerism
British essayists
British Quakers
Killultagh
British women non-fiction writers
English essayists
Conway, Anne Finch
English viscountesses
English women non-fiction writers
Conway, Lady Anne Finch
Anne
Philosophers of mind
Philosophers of religion
Rationalists